The Gran Premio di Milano is a Group 2 flat horse race in Italy open to thoroughbreds aged three years or older. It is run at Milan over a distance of 2,400 metres (about 1½ miles), and it is scheduled to take place each year in June.

The event was established in 1889, and during the early part of its history it was contested over 3,000 metres. It was run over 2,600 metres in 1971, and it reverted to its former length the following year. It was cut to 2400 metres in 1974 and again to 2000 metres (its present distance) in 2019. The race was formerly contested at Group 1 level before being downgraded from the 2016 running.

Records
Most successful horse (2 wins):

 Sansonetto – 1895, 1896
 Keepsake – 1903, 1905
 Burne Jones – 1918, 1919
 Manistee – 1924, 1925
 Cranach – 1927, 1928
 Mexico – 1961, 1962
 Marco Visconti – 1966, 1967
 Tony Bin – 1987, 1988
 Quijano – 2008, 2009
 Dylan Mouth – 2015, 2016

Leading jockey since 1970 (3 wins):
 Frankie Dettori – Shantou (1997), Sudan (2007), Dylan Mouth (2016)

Leading trainer since 1986 (3 wins):

 Stefano Botti – Biz The Nurse (2013), Dylan Mouth (2015), Full Drago (2017)
 Peter Schiergen – Quijano (2008, 2009), Durance (2020)

Leading owner since 1986 (3 wins):

 Scuderia Effevi – Jakkalberry (2010), Dylan Mouth (2015, 2016)

Winners since 1986

 The 2020, 2021 and 2022 races distance was 2,000 Meters

Earlier winners

 1889: Amulio
 1890: Fitz Hampton
 1891: Clarisse
 1892: Odin
 1893: Ova
 1894: Times
 1895: Sansonetto
 1896: Sansonetto
 1897: Hira
 1899: Spartivento
 1900: Aigle Royal
 1901: Marcantonio
 1902: Montalbano
 1903: Keepsake
 1904: The Oak
 1905: Keepsake
 1906: Massena
 1907: Pioniere
 1908: Acacia
 1909: Fidia
 1910: Etoile de Feu
 1911: Sablonnet
 1912: Rembrandt
 1913: Misraim
 1914: Austerlitz
 1915: Peerless
 1916: Tronador
 1917: Aristippo
 1918: Burne Jones
 1919: Burne Jones
 1920: Ghiberti
 1921: Valerius
 1922: Lantorna
 1923: Scopas
 1924: Manistee
 1925: Manistee
 1926: Apelle
 1927: Cranach
 1928: Cranach
 1929: Ortello
 1930: Cavaliere d'Arpino
 1931: Guernanville
 1932: Sanzio
 1933: Crapom
 1934: Navarro
 1935: Partenio
 1936: Archidamia
 1937: Donatello
 1938: Nearco
 1939: Vezzano
 1940: Sirte
 1941: Niccolo dell'Arca
 1942: Arco
 1943: Orsenigo
 1944: Macherio
 1945: Fante
 1946: Gladiolo
 1947: Tenerani
 1948: Astolfina
 1949: Antonio Canale
 1950: Fiorillo
 1951: Scai
 1952: Neebisch
 1953: Toulouse Lautrec
 1954: Botticelli
 1955: Oise
 1956: Ribot
 1957: Braque
 1958: Sedan
 1959: Exar
 1960: Malhoa
 1961: Mexico
 1962: Mexico
 1963: Veronese
 1964: Prince Royal
 1965: Accrale
 1966: Marco Visconti
 1967: Marco Visconti
 1968: Stratford
 1969: Epidendrum
 1970: Beaugency
 1971: Weimar
 1972: Beau Charmeur
 1973: Garvin
 1974: Orsa Maggiore
 1975: Star Appeal
 1976: Rouge Sang
 1977: Sirlad
 1978: Stuyvesant
 1979: Sortingo
 1980: Marracci
 1981: Lydian
 1982: Terreno
 1983: Diamond Shoal
 1984: Esprit du Nord
 1985: Shulich

See also
 List of Italian flat horse races

References

 Racing Post:

 galopp-sieger.de – Gran Premio di Milano.
 horseracingintfed.com – International Federation of Horseracing Authorities – Gran Premio di Milano (2017).
 ippodromimilano.it – Albi d'Oro – Milano.
 pedigreequery.com – Gran Premio di Milano – Milano San Siro.

Horse races in Italy
Open middle distance horse races
Recurring sporting events established in 1889
Sports competitions in Milan
1889 establishments in Italy